Sideridis congermana, or the German cousin, is a species of cutworm or dart moth in the family Noctuidae. It is found in North America.

The MONA or Hodges number for Sideridis congermana is 10266.

References

Further reading

External links

 

Hadenini
Articles created by Qbugbot
Moths described in 1874